Calliophis intestinalis, commonly known as the banded Malaysian coral snake, is a species of venomous elapid snake endemic to Southeast Asia.

Geographic range
C. intestinalis is found in Borneo, Indonesia, Java, and Malaysia.

Venom
This small species possesses a potent venom, and human fatalities from its bite have been recorded.

Subspecies
Four subspecies are recognized, including the nominotypical subspecies.

Calliophis intestinalis everetti (Boulenger, 1896)
Calliophis intestinalis intestinalis (Laurenti, 1768)
Calliophis intestinalis lineata (Gray, 1835)
Calliophis intestinalis thepassi (Bleeker, 1859)

Nota bene: A trinomial authority in parentheses indicates that the subspecies was originally described in a genus other than Calliophis.

References

Further reading
 Boulenger GA. 1890. The Fauna of British India, Including Ceylon and Burma. Reptilia and Batrachia. London: Secretary of State for India in Council. (Taylor and Francis, printers). xviii + 541 pp. (Adeniophis intestinalis, pp. 386–387).
 Cantor TE. 1847. Catalogue of Reptiles Inhabiting the Malayan Peninsula and Islands. J. Asiatic Soc. Bengal, Calcutta 16 (2): 607-656, 897-952, 1026-1078. (Elaps intestinalis, p. 1028).
 Laurenti JN. 1768. Specimen medicum, exhibens synopsin reptilium emendatum cum experimentis circa venena et antidota reptilium austriacorum. Vienna: "Joan. Thom. Nob. de Trattnern". 214 pp. + Plates I-V. (Aspis intestinalis, p. 106).
 Slowinski JB, Boundy J, Lawson R. 2001. The phylogenetic relationships of Asian coral snakes (Elapidae: Calliophis and Maticora) based on morphological and molecular characters. Herpetologica 57 (2): 233-245.

External links 
 

intestinalis
Reptiles described in 1768
Taxa named by Josephus Nicolaus Laurenti